2010 Emperor's Cup Final was the 90th final of the Emperor's Cup competition. The final was played at National Stadium in Tokyo on January 1, 2011. Kashima Antlers won the championship.

Match details

See also
2010 Emperor's Cup

References

Emperor's Cup
2010 in Japanese football
Kashima Antlers matches
Shimizu S-Pulse matches